Marius Ionuţ Briceag (born 6 April 1992) is a Romanian professional footballer who plays as a left-back for Ekstraklasa club Korona Kielce. In his career, Briceag also played for teams such as Argeș Pitești, Râmnicu Vâlcea, Universitatea Craiova, FCSB, FC Voluntari and Universitatea Cluj.

Career statistics

Club

Notes

Honours

Club
Universitatea Craiova
Cupa României: 2017–18
Supercupa României runner-up: 2018

Voluntari
Cupa României runner-up: 2021–22

References

External links
 
 

1992 births
Living people
Romanian footballers
Liga I players
Liga II players
Ekstraklasa players
FC Argeș Pitești players
SCM Râmnicu Vâlcea players
CS Universitatea Craiova players
FC Voluntari players
FC Steaua București players
FC Universitatea Cluj players
Korona Kielce players
Association football defenders
Sportspeople from Pitești
Romanian expatriate footballers
Expatriate footballers in Poland
Romanian expatriate sportspeople in Poland